The 1978–79 Hamburger SV season was the 32nd season in the club's history and the 16th consecutive season playing in the Bundesliga.

Season summary

Bundesliga
Despite personal success for star player Kevin Keegan, who won the Ballon d'Or in 1978, the previous season saw mixed results as Hamburg finished ninth in the Bundesliga. Before the 1978–79 season started, Yugoslavian Branko Zebec was appointed manager of HSV. He had previously guided Bayern Munich to the Bundesliga title in 1968–69.

In the summer, new additions to the team were also brought in including Horst Hrubesch, who arrived from Rot-Weiss Essen for £450,000, Jimmy Hartwig, one of Germany’s first non-white players, was signed from 1860 Munich and Bernd Wehmeyer arrived from Hannover 96.

Zebec managed the club to its first ever Bundesliga title in 1978–79, one point ahead of closest challengers VfB Stuttgart, and the club's fourth German championship overall and first since 1960. The team was led by Kevin Keegan along with young, rising German talent including Felix Magath, Horst Hrubesch, and Manfred Kaltz. Keegan was top scorer for HSV, with 17 goals, and was awarded the Ballon d'Or for a second successive year.

Keegan's first goal of the season came in a 5–0 demolition of Borussia Dortmund on 4 November 1978. Hrubesch also needed a bedding-in period and didn’t find the back of the net for his new club until his sixth game but would eventually add 13 goals, benefiting from cross delivered by right-back Manfred Kaltz.

1. FC Kaiserslautern made the early running in the Bundesliga, but HSV closed the gap to one point just before Christmas with a 1–0 victory at Bayern Munich and a 3–1 success against Arminia Bielefeld, a match that saw Keegan score a hat-trick. After 17 rounds, the halfway stage, Kaiserslautern, Hamburg and VfB Stuttgart were separated by just two points.  After the winter break, Hamburg appeared to be off the pace and earned one point from their first three games. By the start of April 1979 and in the midst of a 12 match unbeaten run, a 3–0 win against Kaiserslautern paired with a 1–4 home defeat by Stuttgart at the hands of FC Köln, put HSV in position to win their first Bundesliga title. Hamburg lost to Bayern on the final day of the season but had built a three point lead going into the matchday and were crowned champions with 49 points.

DFB-Pokal
HSV also competed in this season's edition of the DFB-Pokal, losing in the first round to Arminia Bielefeld on 5 August 1978.

Squad

Competitions

Overall record

Bundesliga

League table

Matches
Hamburg's score comes first

DFB Pokal

References

Hamburger SV seasons
Hamburger
German football championship-winning seasons